Adrian Hernandez (born March 25, 1975) is a former Major League Baseball pitcher who played for the New York Yankees and Milwaukee Brewers.

Born in Cuba, Hernández defected to the United States in January 2000.

Baseball career

New York Yankees
Hernandez was signed by the New York Yankees as an amateur free agent on June 2, to a four-year, $4 million contract. He was instantly dubbed the nickname "El Duquecito" due to the similar pitching style of fellow Cuban Orlando Hernández. Hernández flew through the Yankees minor league organization in 2000 after going 8–2, with a 3.89 earned run average and 86 strikeouts in 12 games, all starts.

Hernandez made his major league debut on April 21, versus the Boston Red Sox, pitching three innings allowing one earned run on two hits. He was called up and sent down to the minors on three occasions in 2001 and finished the season, going 0–3 in six games (three starts), with 10 strikeouts and a 3.68 ERA.

In , Hernandez struggled in both the majors and the minors. He finished the season with a 12.00 ERA in two games in the majors. After spending the entire  season in the minors he was granted free agency by the Yankees on October 15, 2003.

Milwaukee Brewers
On October 15, Hernandez signed with the Milwaukee Brewers. After making five relief appearances for the Brewers, he made his first start with the team on May 8, 2004. Despite not allowing any hits, he walked seven batters and gave up three runs in 4.1 innings. On May 11, 2004, he was designated for assignment by the Brewers and was optioned to the Triple-A Indianapolis Indians. In the minors, he struggled, going 0–8 leading to the end of his career.

See also

List of baseball players who defected from Cuba

References

External links
, or Cuban-Play (Series Nacionales), or Pelota Binaria (Venezuelan Winter League)

1975 births
Living people
Cardenales de Lara players
Cuban expatriate baseball players in Venezuela
Columbus Clippers players
Defecting Cuban baseball players
Indianapolis Indians players
Industriales de La Habana players
Major League Baseball players from Cuba
Cuban expatriate baseball players in the United States
Major League Baseball pitchers
Mexican League baseball pitchers
Milwaukee Brewers players
New York Yankees players
Norwich Navigators players
Baseball players from Havana
Tampa Yankees players
Trenton Thunder players
Vaqueros Laguna players
Cuban expatriate baseball players in Mexico